The Smith & Wesson Model 457 is a compact semi-automatic pistol from Smith & Wesson's Third Generation series of alloy and steel-framed handguns in company's Value Line of budget-priced auto pistols. The 457 is a compact pistol chambered for the .45 ACP cartridge.  The design utilizes a double-action/single action trigger mechanism, meaning that the first shot is fired with long double-action pull, with following shots fired in single-action.  The 457's external hammer omits a thumb spur, thereby reducing the risk of being caught on clothing during unholstering.
A slide-mounted safety lever that drops the hammer from its cocked position when moved to the 'safe' position.  The 457 has a  barrel and 7-round magazine capacity.  The Model 457 was produced with a matte-finish carbon steel slide and blackened aluminum alloy frame.  Other versions include the Model 457S with a stainless steel slide and aluminum frame, and the Model 457TDA with a satin-finished aluminum frame and black carbon steel slide.

The compact design of the pistol makes it ideal for concealed carry, and the model developed a reputation for reliability, durability, and accuracy.

References

External links
 Smith & Wesson site

Smith & Wesson semi-automatic pistols
.45 ACP semi-automatic pistols
Semi-automatic pistols of the United States